Son Jeong-im (born 12 December 1968) is a South Korean former field hockey player. She competed in the women's tournament at the 1992 Summer Olympics.

References

External links
 

1968 births
Living people
South Korean female field hockey players
Olympic field hockey players of South Korea
Field hockey players at the 1992 Summer Olympics
Place of birth missing (living people)
Asian Games medalists in field hockey
Asian Games gold medalists for South Korea
Medalists at the 1990 Asian Games
Field hockey players at the 1990 Asian Games
20th-century South Korean women
21st-century South Korean women